Cinderella is a 1967 pantomime cast album by Cliff Richard, the Shadows, the Norrie Paramor orchestra and other members of the pantomime cast. The album is Richard's nineteenth album.

One single, "In the Country" (Richard, with the Shadows backing) was released from the album in December 1966 and reached number 6 in the UK Singles Chart. The album itself reached number 30 in the UK Album Charts in a 5-week run in the top 40.

Track listing
"Welcome to Stoneybrooke" - The Norrie Paramor Orchestra, with The Mike Sammes Singers
"Why Wasn't I Born Rich" - Cliff Richard and The Shadows, with the Norrie Paramor Brass
"Peace and Quiet" - Cliff Richard, with the Norrie Paramor Orchestra
"The Flyder and the Spy" - The Shadows
"Poverty" - Cliff Richard and The Shadows, with the Norrie Paramor Orchestra and The Mike Sammes Singers
"The Hunt" - Cliff Richard and The Shadows, with the Norrie Paramor Orchestra and The Mike Sammes Singers
"In the Country" - Cliff Richard and The Shadows
"Come Sunday" - Cliff Richard and The Shadows
"Dare I Love Him So" - Jackie Lee, with the Norrie Paramor Orchestra and The Mike Sammes Singers
"If Our Dreams Came True" - Cliff Richard and Jackie Lee, with The Norrie Paramor Orchestra
"Autumn" - The Shadows, with the Norrie Paramor Strings
"The King's Place" - Cliff Richard and the Shadows, with The Norrie Paramor Orchestra and The Mike Sammes Singers
"Peace and Quiet (Reprise)" - Cliff Richard and The Shadows
"She Needs Him More than Me" - Cliff Richard and The Shadows
"Hey Doctor Man" - Cliff Richard and The Shadows

Personnel
Taken from the sleeve notes:

 Cliff Richard - Lead vocals
 Norrie Paramor - producer, arranger and conductor
 Norrie Paramor orchestra
 Jackie Lee - vocals
 Mike Sammes Singers - backing vocals
The Shadows:
 Hank Marvin - lead guitar, backing vocals
 Bruce Welch - rhythm guitar, backing vocals
 John Rostill - bass guitar
 Brian Bennett - drums

Music and lyrics by the Shadows.

References

1967 albums
Cliff Richard albums
Albums produced by Norrie Paramor
EMI Columbia Records albums